Monte Vista Lookout Cabin is a structure in Cochise County, Arizona which is on the National Register of Historic Places.  The cabin sits at the base of the Lookout, in the southern portion of the Chiricahua Mountains in the Coronado National Forest.  In 1956, it was erroneously reported that the cabin had been destroyed during a forest fire.  The structure was also threatened by fire in 2011 during the Horseshoe II Fire.

It was built by the Civilian Conservation Corps.

References

National Register of Historic Places in Cochise County, Arizona

		
Buildings and structures completed in 1933
Log cabins
Log buildings and structures in Arizona